Treron is a genus of bird in the pigeon family Columbidae. Its members are commonly called green pigeons. The genus is distributed across Asia and Africa. This genus contains 30 species, remarkable for their green coloration, hence the common name, which comes from a carotenoid pigment in their diet.  Green pigeons have diets of various fruits, nuts, and/or seeds. They dwell in trees and occupy a variety of wooded habitats. Members of this genus can be further grouped into species with long tails, medium-length tails, and wedge-shaped tails. Most species of green pigeon display sexual dimorphism, where males and females can be readily distinguished by different colored plumage.

Behaviour 

Green pigeons usually live in groups but can be found in mating pairs. These birds like to live in wild environment, away from humans. But nowadays, it has been seen that these live on outskirts of cities and towns together with humans.

Nesting 

Their nest is made up of twigs and little branches similar to Common Doves and Pigeons. One of their nest has been seen on Neem tree in Rajasthan India which exactly match with their body colour.

Eggs are laid 4–5 days after making of nest, and eggs hatch in 15–17 days. After hatching, chicks are fed by both male and female parents.

Taxonomy

The genus Treron was introduced in 1816 by the French ornithologist Louis Jean Pierre Vieillot with the thick-billed green pigeon (Treron curvirostra) as the type species. The genus name is from the Ancient Greek trērōn meaning "pigeon" or "dove".

The genus contains 30 species:
 Cinnamon-headed green pigeon (Treron fulvicollis)
 Little green pigeon (Treron olax)
 Pink-necked green pigeon (Treron vernans)
 Orange-breasted green pigeon (Treron bicinctus)
 Pompadour green pigeon complex:
 Sri Lanka green pigeon (Treron pompadora)
 Grey-fronted green pigeon (Treron affinis)
 Ashy-headed green pigeon (Treron phayrei)
 Andaman green pigeon (Treron chloropterus)
 Philippine green pigeon (Treron axillaris)
 Buru green pigeon (Treron aromaticus)
 Thick-billed green pigeon (Treron curvirostra)
 Grey-cheeked green pigeon (Treron griseicauda)
 Sumba green pigeon (Treron teysmannii)
 Flores green pigeon (Treron floris)
 Timor green pigeon (Treron psittaceus)
 Large green pigeon (Treron capellei)
 Yellow-footed green pigeon (Treron phoenicopterus)
 Bruce's green pigeon (Treron waalia)
 Madagascar green pigeon (Treron australis)
 Comoros green pigeon (Treron griveaudi)
 African green pigeon (Treron calvus)
 Pemba green pigeon (Treron pembaensis)
 São Tomé green pigeon (Treron sanctithomae)
 Pin-tailed green pigeon (Treron apicauda)
 Sumatran green pigeon (Treron oxyurus)
 Yellow-vented green pigeon (Treron seimundi)
 Wedge-tailed green pigeon (Treron sphenurus)
 White-bellied green pigeon (Treron sieboldii)
Ryukyu green pigeon (Treron permagnus)
 Taiwan green pigeon (Treron formosae)

References 

 

Taxa named by Louis Jean Pierre Vieillot
Taxonomy articles created by Polbot